CKOI may refer to:

 CKOI-FM, a radio station (96.9) licensed to Montreal, Quebec, Canada
 CKOI (network), a defunct network of radio stations in Quebec based at CKOI-FM